Puerto Ricans have served as members of the United States Armed Forces and have fought in every major conflict in which the United States has been involved from World War I onward.  Many Puerto Ricans, including those of Puerto Rican descent, have distinguished themselves during combat as members of the five branches of the U.S. Military, the Army, Marines, Navy, Air Force and the Coast Guard.

Nine Puerto Ricans have been awarded the United States' highest military decoration—the Medal of Honor—while seven have been awarded the Navy Cross and nineteen have been awarded the Distinguished Service Cross.

The Distinguished Service Cross (DSC) is the second highest military decoration of the United States Army, awarded for extreme gallantry and risk of life in actual combat with an armed enemy force. Actions which merit the Distinguished Service Cross must be of such a high degree to be above those required for all other U.S. combat decorations but not meeting the criteria for the Medal of Honor. The following is a list of the fifteen Puerto Ricans awarded the Distinguished Service Cross with their citations.

On March 18, 2014, President Barack Obama upgraded the Distinguished Service Crosses awarded to Juan E. Negrón, Demensio Rivera, Miguel Vera and Félix M Conde Falcón to the Medal of Honor in a ceremony held in the White House.

World War II

Luis F. Castro
Private First Class Luis F. Castro born in Orocovis, Puerto Rico was assigned to 47th Infantry Regiment, 9th Infantry Division in the U.S. Army. PFC. Castro's platoon was about to be overrun by enemy German forces, when he decided to stay in the rear flank and cover his men's retreat by providing firepower killing 15 of the enemy in the process.

Distinguished Service Cross Citation:

Postscript:

Anibal Irizarry
Private Anibal Irizarry born in Puerto Rico, was assigned to Co. L, 18th Infantry Regiment, 1st Infantry Regiment. Private Irizarry single-handedly destroyed two enemy machine gun nests and captured eight enemy soldiers.

Distinguished Service Cross Citation:

Postscript:
Private Anibal Irizarry was seriously wounded after he destroyed the second machine gun nest and was awarded the Purple Heart Medal.

Joseph Martinez
Private First Class Joseph Martinez born in San Germán, Puerto Rico destroyed a German Infantry unit and tank in Tunis by providing heavy artillery fire, saving his platoon from being attacked in the process. He received the Distinguished Service Cross from General George S. Patton, thus becoming the first Puerto Rican recipient of said military decoration.

Distinguished Service Cross Citation:

Postscript
PFC Martinez was the first Puerto Rican to be awarded the Distinguished Service Cross.

Korean War

Modesto Cartagena

Sergeant First Class Modesto Cartagena (July 21, 1921 – March 2, 2010), born 1920 in Cayey, Puerto Rico, was the most decorated Puerto Rican soldier in history. Cartagena was assigned to Company C, 1st Battalion, 65th Infantry Regiment, 3d Infantry Division in the U.S. Army.

Distinguished Service Cross Citation:

Postscript:
Cartagena's family, upon learning of Modesto's actions, have taken it upon themselves to make a request to Congress, that he be awarded the Medal of Honor.

Badel Hernández Guzmán
Private Badel Hernández Guzmán, from Humacao, Puerto Rico, was assigned to Company I, 65th Infantry Regiment, 3d Infantry Division in the U.S. Army. Private Hernández Guzmán singlehanded destroyed an enemy strongpoint with a flame thrower.

Distinguished Service Cross Citation:

Postscript:
Private Hernández Guzmán was also awarded the Silver Star for his actions.

Elmy L. Matta
1st. Lieutenant Elmy L. Matta* (May 26, 1921 – August 3, 1950) was a member of the 8th Cavalry Regiment (Infantry), 1st CAV DIV.  Lieutenant Matta was killed while personally leading an assault of his company against the enemy in the face of intense small arms and automatic weapons fire.

Distinguished Service Cross Citation:

Postscript:
1st. Lieutenant Elmy L. Matta was buried with full military honors in the Puerto Rico National Cemetery located in Bayamon, Puerto Rico

Juan E. Negrón

Master Sergeant Juan E. Negrón From Corozal, Puerto Rico was assigned to the 65th Infantry, 3d Infantry Division which was also known as the Borinqueneers.  Master Sergeant Negron halted an enemy attack by accurately hurled hand grenades at short range.

Distinguished Service Cross Citation:

Postscript:
His DSC Medal was upgraded to the Medal of Honor on March 18, 2014.

Fabian Nieves Laguer
Corporal Fabian Nieves Laguer was a member of Company C, 65th Infantry Regiment, 3d Infantry Division. Corporal  Nieves Laguer made three separate trips across a fire swept terrain to carry the stricken soldiers to safety. He was then was able to furnish effective fire support to cover the withdrawal and subsequent reorganization of his unit.

Distinguished Service Cross Citation:

Postscript:
A citizen of Kansas falsely used Nieve-Laguer's Silver Star citation as his own.

This one came from another DSC citation. The recipient: Army Cpl. Fabian Nieves-Laguer. He was a member of the famous "Borinqueneers," the 65th Infantry Regiment from Puerto Rico.

Belisario Noriega
Master Sergeant Belisario Noriega served with the 65th Infantry Regiment, 3d Infantry Division.  He led his men through the hostile ranks of the enemy to the safety of the main line of resistance.

Distinguished Service Cross Citation:

Postscript:
Master Sergeant Belisario Noriega died July 21, 1972, and was buried with full military honors in the Puerto Rico National Cemetery located in Bayamon, Puerto Rico

Demensio Rivera

Private First Class Demensio Rivera* was born in Cabo Rojo, Puerto Rico he was still a child when his parents moved to New York City where he was raised. Rivera was a member of Company G, 2d Battalion, 7th Infantry Regiment, 3d Infantry Division of the U.S. Army. With his automatic rifle, he delivered a continuous and devastating fire at the approaching enemy until this weapon became inoperative, whereupon he employed his pistol and grenades and stopped the enemy within a few feet of his position.

Distinguished Service Cross Citation:

Postscript:
His DSC Medal was upgraded to the Medal of Honor on March 18, 2014.

Frank Carpa Rocha
Corporal Frank Carpa Rocha* (died August 10, 1951) was a heavy machine-gunner with the 15th Infantry Regiment, 3d Infantry Division.  He provided supporting fire which enabled his unit to withdraw. He was attempting to reload his weapon when he was hit by a burst of enemy machine-gun fire and mortally wounded.

Distinguished Service Cross Citation:

Postscript:
Rocha's name was engraved on the Hawaii Korean War Memorial on the Capitol grounds.

Miguel A. Vera

Private Miguel Armando Vera* (died September 21, 1952) was a member of Company F, 2d Battalion, 38th Infantry Regiment, 2d Infantry Division.  He lost his life while he provided firing power to cover the withdrawal of his comrades

Distinguished Service Cross Citation:

Postscript:
Vera was buried with full military honors in the local cemetery of Utuado. His DSC Medal was upgraded to the Medal of Honor on March 18, 2014.

Vietnam War

Félix M Conde Falcón

Staff Sergeant Félix M Conde Falcón*(February 24, 1938 – April 4, 1969) was born in Juncos, Puerto Rico, and raised in Chicago, Ill. He joined the  U.S. Army in April 1963 and was deployed to the Republic of Vietnam a member of the 3rd Platoon, Delta Company, 1st Battalion, 505th Infantry Regiment, 82nd Airborne Division. Conde Falcón was killed in action while serving as a platoon leader during a sweep operation in the vicinity of Ap Tan Hoa, Vietnam, after destroying multiple enemy bunkers and demonstrating extraordinary leadership under fire.

Distinguished Service Cross Citation:

Postscript:
His DSC Medal was upgraded to the Medal of Honor on March 18, 2014.

Efraín Figueroa-Meléndez

Staff Sergeant Efraín Figueroa-Meléndez (died March 5, 1969) was born in Cataño, Puerto Rico. He was a member of Company D, 3d Battalion, 8th Infantry Regiment, 4th Infantry Division of the U.S. Army. On three occasions Staff Sergeant Figueroa-Meléndez purposely drew communist volleys on himself to permit his men to draw back to protected positions.

Distinguished Service Cross Citation:

Postscript:
Staff Sergeant Efraín Figueroa-Meléndez was buried with full military honors in the Puerto Rico National Cemetery located in Bayamon, Puerto Rico.

Fruto James Oquendo
Spc4 Fruto James Oquendo* (died May 6, 1969) of Puerto Rican descent, was born in New York City.  Oquendo was a member of the U.S. Army and in Vietnam served with Company C, 2d Battalion, 8th Cavalry Regiment, 1st Brigade of the 1st Cavalry Division. He was mortally wounded while defending his area during a hand-to-hand struggle.

Distinguished Service Cross Citation:

Postscript: 
Oquendo was buried with full military honors in Long Island National Cemetery, East Farmingdale, Suffolk County, New York, Plot: 2A, 5277

Wilfredo Pagan-Lozada
Sergeant First Class Wilfredo Pagan-Lozada* (died February 9, 1967) born in New York City to Puerto Rican parents, Pagan-Lozada was a member of the U.S. Army and served in Vietnam with Company D, 2d Battalion, 5th Cavalry Regiment, 1st Cavalry Division. At the cost of his life, Sgt. Pagan-Lozada, charged into a through a hail of bullets to save an officers life.

Distinguished Service Cross Citation:

Postscript: 
Pagan-Lozada was buried with full military honors in Long Island National Cemetery, East Farmingdale, Suffolk County, New York.

Ramiro Ramirez
First Sergeant Ramiro Ramirez was a member of Company C, 1st Battalion, 18th Infantry Regiment, 2d Brigade, 1st Infantry Division. First Sergeant Ramirez despite being wounded pulled one of his man to the safety of a bomb crater and refused aid until all others had been treated. Receiving word that another man had been severely wounded, Sergeant Ramirez volunteered to rescue him and was hit in the arm and chest as he left the crater.

Distinguished Service Cross Citation:

Postscript: 
Ramiro Ramirez passed away Nov. 30, 2005, in Temple, Texas. He was buried with full Military Honors in Arlington National Cemetery Arlington, Va.

Reinaldo Rodríguez
Private First Class Reinaldo Rodríguez* (died January 15, 1971) was born in Guanica, Puerto Rico. He belonged to Company C, 1st Battalion, 27th Infantry Regiment, 2d Brigade, 25th Infantry Division in the U.S. Army. Private Rodriguez  provided cover fire for his comrades maintaining suppressive fire upon the adversary until he was wounded a third time. Although evacuated immediately to the rear medical facilities, Private Rodriguez succumbed to his wounds.

Distinguished Service Cross Citation:

Postscript: 
Rodriguez's name is among those inscribed in "El Monumento de la Recordación" in San Juan Puerto Rico.

Aristides Sosa

Corporal Aristides Sosa* (December 14, 1946 – March 2, 1968) was born in Puerto Rico. His parents moved to New York City in 1947 when he was one year old.  In 1967,  he received a draft notice while attending Baruch College of Business Administration. He was drafted into the Army via the Selective Service system during the Vietnam War. He served in Company A, 65th Engineer Battalion, 25th Infantry Division in the U.S. Army. On March 2, 1968, Corporal Sosa rolled on top of a grenade to save another soldier from its blast and was mortally wounded by the exploding grenade.

Distinguished Service Cross Citation:

Postscript: 
Sosa's name is among those inscribed on Panel 42E, LINE 43 of the Vietnam Veteran's Memorial in Washington DC.. In July 2010, Building 200 on Fort Belvoir, Virginia, was rededicated as the Sosa Community Center in Corporal Aristides Sosa’ honor. It houses Army Community Service and the Soldier Family Assistance Center.

El Monumento de la Recordación

The names of the Distinguished Service Cross recipients who perished in combat are inscribed in Puerto Rico's "El Monumento de la Recordación" (Monument of Remembrance). The monument is dedicated to the Puerto Ricans (both those who were born in the island and/or those who were born elsewhere, but are of Puerto Rican descent) who have fallen in combat as members of the Armed Forces of the United States. The monument is located in front of the Capitol Building of Puerto Rico in San Juan.

See also

Puerto Rican recipients of the Medal of Honor
Puerto Rican recipients of the Navy Cross
Distinguished Service Cross
List of Puerto Rican military personnel
Military history of Puerto Rico
Puerto Rican Campaign
Puerto Ricans in World War I
Puerto Ricans in World War II
Puerto Ricans in the Vietnam War
Puerto Ricans Missing in Action - Korean War
Puerto Ricans Missing in Action - Vietnam War
Puerto Rican women in the military
65th Infantry Regiment
Puerto Rican recipients of the Presidential Medal of Freedom
Puerto Rican recipients of the Presidential Citizens Medal

Notes
 N.B. An asterisk after the name indicates that the award was given posthumously.

References

Further reading
Puertorriquenos Who Served With Guts, Glory, and Honor. Fighting to Defend a Nation Not Completely Their Own; by : Greg Boudonck; 
Historia militar de Puerto Rico; by: Hector Andres Negroni; publisher=Sociedad Estatal Quinto Centenario (1992);

External links
Hometown Heroes from Puerto Rico
Puerto Rico's 65th Infantry Distinguished Service Cross

Recipients of the Distinguished Service Cross (United States)
Puerto Rican military personnel
Distinguished Service Cross recipients
Military in Puerto Rico